Shefali Razdan Duggal (born November 22, 1971) is an Indian-American political activist and diplomat serving as the United States ambassador to the Netherlands. She was previously appointed by President Barack Obama to the United States Holocaust Memorial Council, which supervises the United States Holocaust Memorial Museum, for a term which expired in January 2018.

Razdan Duggal served on the board of Emily's List, served as a Deputy National Finance Director of the Democratic National Committee and recently served on the National Finance Committee of Joe Biden for President 2020. Razdan Duggal also recently accepted an invitation to join the Leadership and Character Council at Wake Forest University (Winston-Salem NC).

Early life and education 
Razdan Duggal, a Kashmiri Pandit, was born in Haridwar, Uttar Pradesh (present day Uttarakhand), and moved with her family to Pittsburgh, Pennsylvania at age two. She then moved to Cincinnati, Ohio at age five, where she grew up and graduated from Sycamore High School. She has a Bachelor of Science degree in Mass Communication from Miami University and an Master of Arts degree in Media Ecology from New York University.

Career 
Razdan Duggal began her career in politics volunteering for the Massachusetts Democratic Party and the New Hampshire Democratic Party before moving on to volunteer for Senator Ted Kennedy and Senator Dianne Feinstein. Razdan Duggal started her work in presidential campaigns with the Al Gore 2000 presidential campaign, where she was a volunteer and at-large delegate representing the Commonwealth of Massachusetts. Following the 2000 United States presidential election, she worked for Staton Hughes, a political strategy firm, as a Political Analyst and also became a graduate of Emerge America, a political leadership training program for Democratic women.

After a short hiatus, Razdan Duggal rejoined political activism with outreach and fundraising for the Hillary Clinton 2008 presidential campaign. She was a member of Women for Hillary and the Northern California Steering Committee. After Clinton lost the nomination to then-Senator Barack Obama, Razdan Duggal joined his team as a member of the Obama for America National Finance Committee.

Simultaneously continuing her work with President Obama, Shefali joined Kamala Harris's successful campaign for attorney general of California and later for her transition team.

During the 2012 United States presidential election, Razdan Duggal worked for the Barack Obama 2012 presidential campaign as part of the National Finance Committee, an Obama Victory Trustees co-chair, and a Northern California Finance Committee Member. During the 2012 Democratic National Convention, Shefali was a member of the Credentials Standing Committee and an at-large delegate representing the state of California.

Razdan Duggal was a National Finance Committee member for the Hillary Clinton 2016 presidential campaign. During the 2016 Democratic National Convention, Razdan Duggal was a member of the Rules Standing Committee. She was mentioned in a New York Times article in 2016 as some of her emails were included in the 2016 Democratic National Committee email leak that were released by WikiLeaks.

During the 2020 United States presidential election, Razdan Duggal worked on the National Finance Committee of the Joe Biden 2020 presidential campaign and as a national co-chair of Women for Biden. She was a vice chair of the Credentials Standing Committee and an at-large delegate representing the state of California at the 2020 Democratic National Convention.

United States ambassador to the Netherlands
On March 11, 2022, President Joe Biden nominated Razdan Duggal to be the United States ambassador to the Netherlands. Hearings on her nomination were held before the Senate Foreign Relations Committee on July 28, 2022. Her nomination was approved by the Senate on September 14, 2022. She presented her credentials to King Willem-Alexander on October 19, 2022.

Affiliations 

 Democratic National Committee, Deputy National Finance Chair
 Emily's List, Board Member
 Human Rights First, Board of Advocates
 Human Rights Watch, California Committee North Board
 Miami University Inside Washington, National Advisory Board
 United States Holocaust Memorial Council, Western Region Advisor
 Wake Forest University, Leadership and Character Council

Personal life 
Razdan Duggal lives in San Francisco and is married to Rajat Duggal. She has two children.

References

1971 births
Living people
20th-century American women
21st-century American diplomats
21st-century American women
People from San Francisco
Ambassadors of the United States to the Netherlands
American people of Kashmiri descent
American politicians of Indian descent
American women ambassadors
American women civil servants
California Democrats
California politicians of Indian descent
Indian emigrants to the United States
American women diplomats